The Grace and Robert Miller Ranch represents an expansion of the previously existing Miller Cabin listing on the National Register of Historic Places. The ranch was the home of Robert E. Miller, first superintendent of Jackson Hole National Monument. The property was transferred to the U.S. Fish and Wildlife Service as part of the National Elk Refuge.

References

External links

Grace and Robert Miller Ranch at the Wyoming State Historic Preservation Office

Buildings and structures in Grand Teton National Park
Ranches on the National Register of Historic Places in Wyoming
National Register of Historic Places in Grand Teton National Park